Jorge Alberto Ortiz (born June 20, 1984, in Castelar) is an Argentine football player, who plays as a midfielder.

Career
Ortiz made his professional debut for San Lorenzo in 2004. He was loaned to Arsenal de Sarandí for the 2006–07 season, so he played no part in San Lorenzo's Clausura winning campaign. He returned to San Lorenzo for the start of the 2007 Apertura. Later in 2007, Ortiz moved to Swedish club AIK. Although he was plagued by injuries during his debut season for the club, he established himself as a key player for the team during the 2009 campaign where they won the double. In June 2010, AIK and Jorge Ortiz mutually decided to break off their contract, which would have expired in December 2011.

Ortiz rejoined Arsenal de Sarandí on a three-year contract by the start of the 2010–11 Argentine Primera División season. After three years and 100 league appearances with Arsenal, Ortiz left to join Lanús, where he scored 4 goals in 51 league matches before moving clubs once again, this time agreeing to join Independiente in June 2015. He made his Independiente debut on the 26th of July against Atlético de Rafaela. After going out on loan to Tijuana, he had stints at Belgrano, Tigre and a very short spell with Patronato before joining Arsenal de Sarandí for a 3rd time, Arsenal fans were very excited when one of their most successful players came back to play for their club.

Club
.

Honours
AIK
Allsvenskan (1): 2009
Svenska Cupen (1): 2009
Supercupen (1): 2010

Arsenal
Argentine Primera División (1): 2012 Clausura
Supercopa Argentina (1): 2012

Lanús
Copa Sudamericana (1): 2013

References

External links
 Argentine Primera statistics at Fútbol XXI
 Football-Lineups player profile

1984 births
Living people
AIK Fotboll players
Sportspeople from Buenos Aires Province
Argentine footballers
Argentine expatriate footballers
Association football midfielders
San Lorenzo de Almagro footballers
Arsenal de Sarandí footballers
Club Atlético Lanús footballers
Club Atlético Independiente footballers
Club Tijuana footballers
Club Atlético Belgrano footballers
Club Atlético Tigre footballers
Argentine Primera División players
Allsvenskan players
Liga MX players
Expatriate footballers in Sweden
Expatriate footballers in Mexico
Argentine expatriate sportspeople in Sweden
Argentine expatriate sportspeople in Mexico